Li Hanwen (born 22 August 2002) is a Chinese tennis player.
 
Li has a career high ATP singles ranking of World No. 1070 achieved on 5 April 2021. He also has a career high doubles ranking of World No. 1828 achieved on 26 April 2021.

Li has reached his first and presently only career final at the M15 Sharm El Sheikh, Egypt World Tennis Tour tournament on hard courts in April 2021 in the doubles. He and Brazilian partner Oscar José Gutierrez had to withdraw from the final, handing the title over to opponents Ryan Nijboer and Neil Oberleitner.

Li will make his ATP Tour debut at the 2021 Geneva Open where he has been given a wild card entry into the main doubles draw alongside Arthur Cazaux of France. They are slotted to play veteran players Marin Čilić and Andrey Golubev in the first round. He also received a wild card entry into the qualifying draw for the singles portion of the tournament, but he lost in the first round to Ilya Ivashka of Belarus in straight sets 0–6, 3–6.

ATP Challenger and ITF Futures finals

Singles: 1 (1–0)

Doubles: 6 (3–3)

References

External links
 
 

2002 births
Living people
Chinese male tennis players
Tennis players from Jiangsu
21st-century Chinese people